Sofia is the capital and largest city of Bulgaria. Politically, administratively and economically, Bulgaria is a highly centralised state. Sofia Municipality is the only municipality in Sofia City Province, which is distinct from Sofia Province, which surrounds but does not include the capital itself. Besides the city proper, the 24 districts of Sofia Municipality encompass three other towns and 34 villages. Each of them has its own district mayor who is elected in a popular election. The head of the Sofia Municipality is its mayor. The assembly members are chosen every four years. The current mayor of Sofia is Yordanka Fandakova.

References